The Bangladesh cricket team toured South Africa in September and October 2017 to play two Tests, three One Day Internationals (ODIs) and two Twenty20 International (T20I) matches. It was Bangladesh's first tour of South Africa in nine years. Ahead of the series, Faf du Plessis was appointed captain of South Africa's ODI side, replacing AB de Villiers, therefore captaining South Africa in all three formats. However, du Plessis suffered an injury during the third ODI ruling him out of the T20I series, with JP Duminy replacing him as captain.

South Africa won the Test series 2–0, the ODI series 3–0 and the T20I series 2–0.

Squads

Morné Morkel was ruled out of South Africa's squad for the second Test with a side strain. Dane Paterson was added to the squad as his replacement. Bangladesh's Tamim Iqbal was also ruled out of the second Test due to injury.

Wayne Parnell was ruled out of the last two ODIs due to injury and was replaced by Wiaan Mulder in South Africa's squad. Shafiul Islam was added to Bangladesh's ODI squad as cover for Mustafizur Rahman. For the final ODI, Hashim Amla was rested with Aiden Markram added to South Africa's squad as his replacement. Tamim Iqbal suffered an injury during the second ODI and was ruled out of the rest of the tour.

Faf du Plessis injured himself during the third ODI and was ruled out of the T20I series as a result. JP Duminy replaced him as captain and Dwaine Pretorius was added to South Africa's T20I squad.

Tour matches

Three-day match: Cricket South Africa Invitation XI v Bangladesh

One-day match: Cricket South Africa Invitation XI v Bangladesh

Test series

1st Test

2nd Test

ODI series

1st ODI

2nd ODI

3rd ODI

T20I series

1st T20I

2nd T20I

Notes

References

External links
 Series home at ESPN Cricinfo

2017 in Bangladeshi cricket
2017 in South African cricket
International cricket competitions in 2017–18
Bangladeshi cricket tours of South Africa